Agostino Casaroli (24 November 1914 – 9 June 1998) was an Italian Catholic priest and diplomat for the Holy See, who became Cardinal Secretary of State. He was the most important figure behind the Vatican's efforts to deal with the persecution of the Church in the nations of the Soviet bloc after the Second Vatican Council.

Biography
Casaroli was born in Castel San Giovanni in the province of Piacenza, Italy, to a family of humble roots. His father was a tailor in Piacenza.  He was educated at the Collegio Alberoni in Piacenza the Episcopal Seminary of Bedonia, Piacenza, the Pontifical Lateran University in Rome where he earned a doctorate in canon law, and at the Pontifical Ecclesiastical Academy.

Early career
He was ordained to the priesthood on 27 May 1937 in Piacenza. He studied in Rome from 1937 to 1939. Beginning in 1940 he served in the Vatican Secretariat of State while also participating in pastoral ministry in the diocese of Rome from 1943. He was named Privy Chamberlain of His Holiness on 4 January 1945. He served as chaplain of Villa Agnese from 1950 to 1998. He was raised to the rank of Domestic prelate of His Holiness on 22 December 1954.

He served as an assistant to Cardinal Adeodato Giovanni Piazza at the First General Conference of the Latin American Bishops in Rio de Janeiro, Brazil, in 1955. He served as a faculty member of the Pontifical Ecclesiastical Academy from 1958 to 1961. On 24 February 1961, he was appointed Undersecretary of the Sacred Congregation for Extraordinary Ecclesiastical Affairs, effectively deputy foreign minister. In 1964, he represented the Holy See at the exchange of instruments in ratification of the modus vivendi with Tunisia, concerning the situation of the Catholic Church. He was a signatory of the partial agreement between the Holy See and Hungary in Budapest on 15 September 1964. He negotiated with the Communist Czechoslovak government over the appointment of František Tomášek as apostolic administrator of the Archdiocese of Prague in February 1965. He was appointed secretary of the Sacred Congregation for Extraordinary Ecclesiastical Affairs on 29 June 1967.

Pope Paul consecrated him a bishop on 16 July 1967.

During the period following Vatican II, Casaroli gained a reputation as a highly skilled diplomat who was able to negotiate with regimes hostile to the Church. He headed the CSCE conference in Helsinki from 30 July to 1 August 1975.  On 28 April 1979, he was appointed Pro-Secretary of State.

Cardinal
Casaroli was made a Cardinal-Priest of Ss. XII Apostoli in John Paul II's first consistory in 1979, and at the same time he became Secretary of State. Although he was seen as less hardline than any other close associate of John Paul, Casaroli's skillful diplomacy was seen by Wojtyła as an irreplaceable asset in the struggle against the Soviet Union.

In 1985 he became Cardinal Bishop of the suburbicarian diocese of Porto-Santa-Rufina, and in 1990 he retired as Secretary of State, being succeeded by Angelo Sodano (who became Pro-Secretary of State at that time). He was Vice-Dean of the College of Cardinals from 1993 until his 1998 death of cardiorespiratory disease.

Views

Relations with Communism
Casaroli's signing of treaties with Hungary in 1964 and Yugoslavia in 1966 was the first time the Holy See had opened itself in this way to Communist regimes. Although his 2000 memoirs revealed a man hostile to Communism, his remarkable diplomatic skill made this hostility appear non-existent.

According to John O. Koehler, the KGB and its "brother organs" in Eastern Europe were well aware of Cardinal Casaroli's real opinions and influence. Therefore, his personal office was one of the primary espionage targets inside the Vatican.

The KGB was assisted in this by the Cardinal's own nephew, Marco Torreta, and Torreta's Czechoslovakian wife Irene Trollerova. According to Italian intelligence officials, Torreta had been a KGB informant since 1950.

According to Koehler:
Irene returned from Czechoslovakia in the early 1980s, with a ceramic statue of the Virgin Mary, about 10 inches high, a beautiful work of renowned Czech ceramic art. The couple presented the statue to Cardinal Casaroli, who accepted gratefully. What a betrayal by his own nephew! Inside the revered religious icon was a "bug", a tiny but powerful transmitter, which was monitored from outside the building by the couple's handlers from the Soviet Embassy in Rome. The statue had been placed in an armoire in the dining room close to Cardinal Casaroli's office. Another eavesdropping device inside a rectangular piece of wood was hidden in the same armoire. Both were not discovered til 1990 during a massive probe initiated by Magistrate Rosario Priore in the aftermath of the assassination attempt on Pope John Paul II. The bugs had been transmitting until that time."

Teilhard de Chardin
On 10 June 1981, on the 100th anniversary of Pierre Teilhard de Chardin's birth, L'Osservatore Romano, the official Vatican newspaper, published a letter by Casaroli that praised the "astonishing resonance of his research, as well as the brilliance of his personality and richness of his thinking." Casaroli wrote that Teilhard had anticipated John Paul II's call to "be not afraid", embracing "culture, civilization and progress". The letter was antedated 12 May 1981, the day prior to the attempted assassination of Pope John Paul II, but was published during his convalescence. On 20 July 1981, a communiqué of the Press Office of the Holy See stated that the letter did not change the position of the warning issued by the Holy Office on 30 June 1962, which pointed out that Chardin's work contained ambiguities and grave doctrinal errors.

Honors
Honorary degree, University of Pavia, 1991

In popular culture
Cardinal Casaroli was portrayed by veteran character actor Ben Gazzara in the 2005 miniseries, Pope John Paul II.

References

Additional sources
Alberto Melloni (ed), Il Filo Sottile: L'Ostpolitik vaticana di Agostino Casaroli (Bologna: Società Editrice il Mulino, 2006) (Santa Sede e Politica nel Novecento, 4.).
Marco Lavopa, « Mgr Agostino CASAROLI un habile "tisseur de dialogues européens" (1963 – 1975)», Revue de l’histoire des religione, an. 2014, vol. 1, pp. 101-115, Armand Colin, Paris.
Marco Lavopa, « Le 'dialogue de compromis'. L’Ostpolitik vaticane de Mgr. Agostino Casaroli dans la Yougoslavie de Tito », Revue d’histoire diplomatique, an. 2013, vol. 2, pp. 157-178, A. Pedone, Paris.
Marco Lavopa, La diplomazia dei 'piccoli passi'. L’Ostpolitik vaticana di Mons Agostino Casaroli'', GBE, Roma 2013.
Marco Lavopa, « Les acteurs religieux ont-ils des pratiques diplomatiques spécifiques? La politique orientale vaticane et la "méthode Casaroli" dans le temps present », "Revue suisse d'histoire religieuse et culturelle", Academic Press of Fribourg, an. 2019, vol. 113, pp. 319−344.

External links
Official website
BBC report on his death
Article on his memoirs

1914 births
1998 deaths
Presidents of the Pontifical Commission for Vatican City State
People from the Province of Piacenza
20th-century Italian cardinals
Cardinal-bishops of Porto
Diplomats of the Holy See
Pontifical Ecclesiastical Academy alumni
Pontifical Lateran University alumni
Cardinal Secretaries of State
Administration of the Patrimony of the Apostolic See
Cardinals created by Pope John Paul II